Short track speed skating at the 2013 Winter Universiade was held at the Trento Ghiaccio Arena in Trento from December 18 to December 20, 2013.

Men's events

Women's events 

* Skaters who did not participate in the final, but received medals.

External links
Official results at the universiadetrentino.org.

2013 in short track speed skating
Short track speed skating
International speed skating competitions hosted by Italy
2013